Reyes's Caribbean gecko (Aristelliger reyesi) is a species of lizard in the family Sphaerodactylidae. The species is endemic to Cuba.

Etymology
The specific name, reyesi, is in honor of Cuban photographer Ernesto Reyes who discovered this species.

Geographic range
A. reyesi is known only from the Hicacos Peninsula in Matanzas Province, Cuba.

Description

References

Further reading
Díaz, Luis M.; Hedges, S. Blair (2009). "First record of the genus Aristelliger (Squamata: Sphaerodactylidae) in Cuba, with the description of a new species". Zootaxa 2028: 31–40. (Aristelliger reyesi, new species).

Aristelliger
Reptiles described in 2009
Endemic fauna of Cuba